Sir Astley Paston Cooper, 1st Baronet   (23 August 176812 February 1841) was a British surgeon and anatomist, who made contributions to otology, vascular surgery, the anatomy and pathology of the mammary glands and testicles, and the pathology and surgery of hernia.

Life

Cooper was born at Brooke Hall in Brooke, Norfolk on 23 August 1768 and baptised at the parish church on 9 September. His father, Dr Samuel Cooper, was a clergyman of the Church of England; his mother Maria Susanna Bransby was the author of several novels. At the age of sixteen he was sent to London and placed under Henry Cline (1750–1827), surgeon to St Thomas' Hospital. From the first he devoted himself to the study of anatomy, and had the privilege of attending the lectures of John Hunter. In 1789 he was appointed demonstrator of anatomy at St Thomas' Hospital, where in 1791 he became joint lecturer with Cline in anatomy and surgery, and in 1800 he was appointed surgeon to Guy's Hospital on the death of his uncle, William Cooper.

In 1802 Cooper received the Copley Medal for two papers read before the Royal Society of London on the destruction of the tympanic membrane and was elected a Fellow of that society the same year. In 1805 he took an active part in the formation of the Medical and Chirurgical Society of London, and in 1804 he brought out the first, and in 1807 the second, part of his great work on hernia, which added so largely to his reputation that in 1813 his annual professional income rose to 21,000 pounds sterling. In the same year he was appointed professor of comparative anatomy to the Royal College of Surgeons and was very popular as a lecturer.

In 1817 Cooper performed his famous operation of tying the abdominal aorta for aneurism; and in 1820 he removed an infected sebaceous cyst from the head of George IV. About six months afterwards he received a baronetcy, which, as he had no son, was to descend to his nephew and adopted son, Astley Cooper. He was appointed sergeant surgeon to George IV in 1828. He served as president of the Royal College of Surgeons in 1827 and again in 1836, and he was elected a vice-president of the Royal Society in 1830. In 1821, he was elected a foreign member of the Royal Swedish Academy of Sciences. He died on 12 February 1841 in London, and is interred, by his own desire, in the crypt of the Chapel of Thomas Guy, St Thomas Street (on the site now shared by King's College London and Guy's Hospital). A statue by Edward Hodges Baily was erected in St Paul's Cathedral.

Cooper lived at Gadebridge House in the market town of Hemel Hempstead. Due to his influence, among others who were also residents of the area, his vigorous lobbying ensured that the London to Birmingham main railway line was constructed to the south of the town instead of through it, a more natural course. This led to the citizens of Hemel Hempstead having no railway station in their town.

Today, Cooper is remembered in the area with a number of local street names (Astley Cooper Place in the village of his birth, Brooke, Norfolk), (Astley Road and Paston Road in Hemel Hempstead), and The Astley Cooper School, formerly Grovehill school, being renamed after him in 1984.

Works
In the field of vascular surgery and cerebral circulation, Cooper was the first to demonstrate experimentally the effects of bilateral ligation of the carotid arteries in dogs and to propose treatment of aneurysms by ligation of the vessel. In 1805 he published in the first volume of Medico-Chirurgical Transactions, an account of his attempt to tie the common carotid artery for treating an aneurysm in a patient. In 1808 he tried the same with the external iliac artery for a femoral aneurysm and in 1817 he ligated the aorta for an iliac aneurysm.

Cooper was an anatomist and identified several previously undescribed anatomical structures, many of which were named after him:
 Cooper's fascia, a covering of the spermatic cord.
 Cooper's pubic ligament, the superior pubic ligament.
 Cooper's stripes, a fibrous structure in the ulnar ligaments.
 Cooper's ligaments, the suspensory ligaments of the breasts.

He also described a number of new diseases, which likewise became eponymous:
 Cooper's testis (neuralgia of the testicles)
 Cooper's disease (benign cysts of the breast)
 Cooper's hernia (retroperitoneal hernia)
 Cooper's neuralgia (neuralgia of the breast)

His chief published works were:
 Anatomy and Surgical Treatment of Hernia (1804–1807);
 Dislocations and Fractures (1822);
 Lectures on Surgery (1824–1827);
 Illustrations of Diseases of the Breast (1829);
 Anatomy of the Thymus Gland (1832);
 Anatomy of the Breast (1840).

Many of Cooper's original experimental and surgical specimens are now held in the collections of the Gordon Museum of Pathology.

See also
 Pathology
 List of pathologists

References

Sources

Further reading

External links

 Astley Paston Cooper biography. WhoNamedIt.
 Sir Astley Paston Cooper History of Surgeons from surgeons.org.uk.
 Sir Astley Cooper. Surgical-Tutor.
 On the anatomy of the breast, 1840. Digital reproduction of the book.
 
 Sir Astley Paston Cooper and Hoo Loo

1768 births
1841 deaths
British anatomists
British surgeons
19th-century English medical doctors
English pathologists
Recipients of the Copley Medal
Members of the Royal Swedish Academy of Sciences
Baronets in the Baronetage of the United Kingdom
People from Hemel Hempstead
18th-century English people
Fellows of the Royal Society
People from Brooke, Norfolk
Physicians of Guy's Hospital